Diego Vicente Aguirre Camblor (born 13 September 1965) is a Uruguayan football manager and former player who played as a forward. He is the manager of Olimpia.

Playing career
A Liverpool Montevideo youth graduate, Aguirre joined the club in 1982 at the age of 16, and made his senior debut in the following year. In 1986, he moved to city rivals Peñarol, and was a part of the squad which won the 1987 Copa Libertadores, scoring a last-minute winner in the Final.

In 1988, after an unassuming spell with Olympiacos, Aguirre had a brief stint with Sven-Göran Eriksson's ACF Fiorentina, appearing only in the Coppa Italia. He subsequently moved to Brazil, representing Internacional and São Paulo.

In the following years Aguirre rarely settled into a club, and played for Portuguesa, Independiente, Peñarol, Bolívar, CA Marbella, Danubio, CD Ourense, Deportivo FAS, River Plate Montevideo, Deportes Temuco and Rentistas.

Managerial career
After starting his career with Plaza Colonia in 2002, Aguirre returned to his former club Peñarol in 2003. Despite winning the year's championship, he was sacked in December 2004.

On 20 December 2005, Aguirre was named in charge of Aucas, but was sacked the following March. In 2007, he was appointed manager of Montevideo Wanderers, and was subsequently in charge of Alianza Lima for just five matches.

In 2008, Aguirre was named Uruguay under-20 manager, after a request of Óscar Tabárez. On 7 December 2010 he returned to Peñarol, winning another national championship and reaching the finals of the 2011 Copa Libertadores, where his side lost to Santos.

On 5 September 2011, Aguirre signed for Al-Rayyan, remaining in charge until 4 November 2013. He subsequently replaced Zico at the helm of Al-Gharafa, being appointed on 2 February 2014.

On 22 December 2014, Aguirre was named manager of another club he represented as a player, Internacional, being relieved from his duties the following 6 August. On 3 December 2015, he signed a two-year deal with Atlético Mineiro, resigning on 19 May.

On 27 June 2016, Aguirre replaced Pablo Guede at the helm of San Lorenzo. On 22 September of the following year, he resigned after being knocked out of the year's Copa Libertadores.

On 11 March 2018, Aguirre was appointed manager of another former club, São Paulo. On 11 November, after falling down from the first to the fifth position, he left the club.

He returned to Al Rayyan for a second spell in July 2019. In his first season, the club finished second in the league without to win any trophies, also the team were eliminated in the AFC Champions League play-off round. During Aguirre's second season as head coach, he saw some of his top players leaving the club, Hamid Ismail, Sebastián and Tabata, after a poor run of results in their first matches, Aguirre announced on the media that he would be leaving the club by mutual agreement, he was linked to São Paulo on 6 October 2020, He left the club after the disappointing draw against Al-Arabi on 11 December. One week later, Aguirre replaced by French coach Laurent Blanc.

On 19 June 2021, Aguirre returned to Brazil and Internacional, after replacing Miguel Ángel Ramírez. He left the club on a mutual agreement on 15 December, after missing out a Copa Libertadores spot in the last round.

Managerial statistics

Honours

Player
 Peñarol
Uruguayan Primera División: 1986
Copa Libertadores: 1987

 Deportivo FAS
Salvadoran Primera División: 1996

Manager
 Peñarol
Uruguayan Primera División: 2003, 2009–10

 Al-Rayyan
Qatar Crown Prince Cup: 2012
Emir of Qatar Cup: 2013
Sheikh Jassem Cup: 2012, 2013

 Internacional
 Campeonato Gaúcho: 2015

Cruz Azul
Supercopa de la Liga MX: 2022

References

External links
  
 

1965 births
Living people
Footballers from Montevideo
Uruguayan people of Basque descent
Uruguayan footballers
Uruguayan Primera División players
Liverpool F.C. (Montevideo) players
Peñarol players
Danubio F.C. players
Club Atlético River Plate (Montevideo) players
Campeonato Brasileiro Série A players
Sport Club Internacional players
São Paulo FC players
Associação Portuguesa de Desportos players
Argentine Primera División players
Club Atlético Independiente footballers
Segunda División players
CA Marbella footballers
Super League Greece players
Olympiacos F.C. players
C.D. FAS footballers
Chilean Primera División players
Deportes Temuco footballers
Uruguayan expatriate footballers
Uruguayan expatriate sportspeople in Greece
Uruguayan expatriate sportspeople in Italy
Uruguayan expatriate sportspeople in Brazil
Uruguayan expatriate sportspeople in Argentina
Uruguayan expatriate sportspeople in Spain
Uruguayan expatriate sportspeople in Chile
Uruguayan expatriate sportspeople in Qatar
Expatriate footballers in Greece
Expatriate footballers in Italy
Expatriate footballers in Argentina
Expatriate footballers in Brazil
Expatriate footballers in Chile
Expatriate footballers in Spain
Expatriate footballers in El Salvador
Uruguayan football managers
Uruguayan Primera División managers
Peñarol managers
Montevideo Wanderers managers
S.D. Aucas managers
Club Alianza Lima managers
Al-Rayyan SC managers
Al-Gharafa SC managers
Campeonato Brasileiro Série A managers
Sport Club Internacional managers
Clube Atlético Mineiro managers
São Paulo FC managers
Argentine Primera División managers
San Lorenzo de Almagro managers
Cruz Azul managers
Uruguayan expatriate football managers
Expatriate football managers in Ecuador
Expatriate football managers in Peru
Expatriate football managers in Argentina
Expatriate football managers in Brazil
Expatriate football managers in Qatar
Association football forwards
Uruguayan expatriate sportspeople in Ecuador
Uruguayan expatriate sportspeople in Bolivia
Uruguayan expatriate sportspeople in Peru
Expatriate football managers in Bolivia
Club Bolívar players
Club Olimpia managers